Los Alamitos High School (also known as Los Al) is a public school for grades 9 to 12 located in Los Alamitos, California, and also serving the city of Seal Beach and the community of Rossmoor. It is the only traditional high school in the Los Alamitos Unified School District; the far smaller Laurel High School serves as a continuation school and as the district office site. Both Oak Middle School and McAuliffe Middle School feed into Los Alamitos High.

History
In its very first year, classes were held at Pine Junior High School (now McAuliffe Middle), and only sophomores attended. The following year saw the school move into its new campus whose buildings were specifically designed for Los Al's unique flexible scheduling program (and the addition of juniors, followed by seniors the next year). During its first two years, Los Alamitos High School had a complete flexible schedule program. Student submitted hand-written multi-part daily schedules during their scheduling class. This allowed them to choose from scheduled sessions of their classes for flexible periods of time, depending on the needs of the teachers and students. In the third year, it changed to a computer scheduling program to provide more administrative accountability for the students' whereabouts. This version of flexible scheduling used then-current computer technology to generate daily class schedules based on each instructor's lesson plans. Students would report each morning to their "scheduling class" to receive their daily schedule – broken into a series of "modules". Each teacher would select the needed number of fifteen-minute modules to allow for that day's instruction, whether it be a test, a lecture, a lab, etc. In their scheduling class, students could rearrange or fill open modules from the "October" schedule, a listing of available classes. This allowed serious students to make the best use of their schedule to attend classes in a sequence that made more sense for that day.

Los Al's unique flexible scheduling was replaced with a traditional school schedule in 1977 after it was discovered that less disciplined students were abusing the system. For those more dedicated students who leveraged the school's unique scheduling to their advantage, Los Al produced an extraordinary number of early graduates, who went on to succeed in the best universities.

Beginning in fall 1987, the Orange County High School of the Arts was resident on its campus, but its success and growth led it to move to a bigger campus in Santa Ana in 2001.

Principals of Los Alamitos High School

Administration

 Principal: Christiana Kraus
 Assistant Principal Curriculum, Instruction, & Instructional Technology: David Platt
 Assistant Principal Special Education, Counseling, & Technology: Cara Vienna
 Assistant Principal Student Services & Attendance: Phillip Bowen
 Assistant Principal Arts, Facilities, Athletics, & Activities: Eddie Courtemarche

Extracurricular activities

Athletic programs

Los Al is known for its success in many Varsity sports. The boys' Varsity Football team won a CIF Southern Section Div. 3 title in 1991, and Division II titles in 1992 and 1993 (the latter a shared title with Esperanza) and won a Division I championship in 2002, and reached the finals and semi-finals on numerous other occasions, most recently in 2004. The Boys' water polo team was also CIF-SS Division II champions in fall 1999, and 2004 and were CIF-SS Masters champions in 2007.

The boys' Los Al Tennis team won the CIF SS Division I Championship in 2001 and again in 2015. After the 2015 season, multiple publications listen the Griffins as the best high school tennis team in the nation. Considering the level of competition in tennis in Southern California, this was a most notable accomplishment.  It was in CIF Division I semi-finals in 1999 and 2000. From 1995 through 2001 it had a league record of 69–1, an overall record of 128–18 and produced 16 All-Orange County selections. Additionally, 55 players were honored as scholar athletes and went on to play at college level. The team received recognition from the Mayors of the cities of Los Alamitos and Seal Beach for its contribution to positive publicity.

The girls' volleyball team has won a number of CIF local and state championships. It was CIF Southern Section Division IA champions in 2002, 2004, and 2013 and won CIF Division I State championships in 2003, 2005, and 2006, and came in second 2013. In 2018, the team won the CIF Southern Section Division 2 championship and lost in the quarterfinals in the CIF Division 1 State Championships.

Girls' soccer won CIF section titles in 1996 (Div. II), 1997 (Div. I) and 2005 (Div. I). The last team was also named the No. 1 team in the nation by Student Sports Magazine. Another indicator of the success of the program was that in 2007 there were 17 Los Al alumni girls playing NCAA Division I soccer.

The Griffin Varsity Boys' soccer team won CIF-Southern Section titles in 1991 and 2002. Alums Mike Munoz (2001) and Jonathan Bornstein (2002) have both made MLS rosters (Galaxy and Chivas USA) and Bornstein was not only the MLS 2007 Rookie of the Year but is currently on the US Men's National team roster.

The boys' Basketball team won CIF Division IA and IAA championships in 2006 and 2007, respectively. Los Al Basketball great Ali Ton holds the assist record at Davidson College

The Los Alamitos High School Marching Band has competed in circuits such as Western Band Association (WBA) and Marching Band Open Series (MBOS). In 2009 and 2010 they placed 1st in the WBA 3A division as well as the combined 1A/2A/3A Finals, and in 2011 and 2012 the unit placed 3rd in the WBA 3A division. In 2013 they placed 2nd in the WBA 3A division, 3rd in the combined 1A/2A/3A Finals, 1st in the MBOS Black Opal division, and 7th in the combined MBOS Finals. The unit also has an award-winning drumline and color guard.

The LAHS Surf Team took second place over all in ISF State Championships in 2009. Boys' Shortboard finished with second place, bodyboard placed third and Girls' Longboard finished as State Champions. Los Al finished in third place in 2008 and First place in 2007 and 2006.

In their fourth season of competition, the LAHS Girls' Lacrosse team was the undefeated CIF Division I Orange County and Southern Section Champions in 2009 and 2010. Los Al finished the season ranked #4 in the state of California.

LAHS Boys' Golf – They have won back to back league championships while setting course records at difficult golf courses. In a win over Newport Harbor this year, the team set the lowest team score there in 7 years.

CIF teams
Note: This list does not include sports which are currently clubs and thus not officially recognized in CIF.

Basketball
Baseball
Softball
Football
Cross Country
Golf
Soccer
Swimming and Diving

Tennis
Track and Field
Volleyball
Wrestling
Water Polo
Surfing
Lacrosse

Other school group programs
Show Choir
Color Guard
Cheerleading
Dance
Marching Band
Drama

Academic accolades
United States Department of Education National Blue Ribbon School – 1990, 1994, 1998 (Special Honors in Art Education for 1998)
California Department of Education California Distinguished School – 1988, 1994, 1998, 2009
California School Boards Association Golden Bell Awards – 1998 (Griffins with a Mission), 2005 (Contemporary Media in the Arts)
California Gold Ribbon School – 2016

Notable alumni

Actors

Dante Basco – actor (Hook, Take the Lead)
Stephanie J. Block – singer, actress (Elphaba in Wicked, Liza Minnelli in The Boy From Oz, and Grace O'Malley in The Pirate Queen on Broadway)
Cathy Cavadini – voice actress (Tanya Mousekewitz in An American Tail: Fievel Goes West, Blossom on The Powerpuff Girls)
Chad Doreck – actor (Grease: You're the One that I Want!)
Susan Egan – singer, actress (First Belle in Beauty and the Beast on Broadway, the voice of Megara in Disney's Hercules)
Kayla Ewell – actress (The Bold and the Beautiful, The O.C.)
Michael Fishman – actor (D.J. Conner on Roseanne)
Lauren German – actress – (The Texas Chainsaw Massacre, Hostel: Part II, Lucifer)
Myles Jeffrey – actor (My Mom's Got a Date With a Vampire, Recess)
Jason Lewis – actor (Sex & The City, Brothers & Sisters)
Allison Mack – actress (Smallville)
Taryn Manning – actress (Crossroads, Hustle & Flow, Cold Mountain)
Matthew Morrison – stage actor (Hairspray on Broadway), plays Mr. Schuster on GleeSarah Ramos – actress
Cathy Rigby – Olympic gymnast, stage actress (Peter Pan)
Matthew Shaffer – actor
Clayton Snyder – actor (Lizzie McGuire)
Jodie Sweetin – actress (Stephanie Tanner on Full House)
Anneliese Van der Pol – singer, actress (That's So Raven, Last Belle in Beauty and the Beast'' on Broadway)

Sports

Jonathan Bornstein 2002 – professional soccer – Querétaro (Liga MX); US national soccer team.
Tim Carey – Former Arena Football League player.
Antoine Cason 2004 – Former NFL player, All-American University of Arizona, 2007 NCAA Jim Thorpe Award Winner.
Ron Cassidy – 1975 – NFL – former (Green Bay Packers) 1979–1985.
Lynne Cox 1975 – long-distance open-water swimmer and author.
Chase d'Arnaud 2005 – MLB – San Diego Padres organization.
Jacqueline Frank DeLuca 1998 – American water polo goalkeeper, 2004 bronze medal Olympian and two-time collegiate National Player of the Year.
Rachel Fattal 2012 – American water polo player, gold medal at 2016 Olympics.
Landry Fields 2006 – NBA – drafted in 2010 by the New York Knicks.
Greg A. Harris 1974 – former Major League Baseball player.
Keenan Howry 1999 – NFL – former Minnesota Vikings wide receiver.
Mike Kelly 1988 – former Major League Baseball player, 3-time All-America at Arizona State.
Chris Kluwe 2000 – Former NFL player.
Tylor Megill – MLB player
Mike Munoz 2001 – Former MLS player.
Stacey Nelson 2005 – Softball – 2009 Florida Gators softball team; US Women's National team, 2009.
Robb Nen 1987 – Retired Major League Baseball player. Played for Texas Rangers, Florida Marlins, San Francisco Giants.
Ifeanyi Ohalete 1997 – NFL & AFL – former Washington Redskins, Arizona Cardinals, Cincinnati Bengals, and New York Dragons safety.
Jacob Nix 2014 – baseball player in the San Diego Padres' organization.
Mike Patterson 2001 – NFL – First round draft in 2005 by the Philadelphia Eagles, currently playing for New York Giants, All-American USC.
Alex Redmond 2013 – NFL player
Bernard Riley 1999 – NFL & AFL – former defensive tackle of the Los Angeles Avengers, Columbus Destroyers, Arizona Rattlers, and Tampa Bay Buccaneers.
Jared Rollins – UFC – The Ultimate Fighter season six on Spike.
Mike Sanford Jr. – offensive coordinator at University of Minnesota, former head coach at Western Kentucky
Orlando Scandrick 2005 – NFL – Dallas Cowboys.
J. T. Snow 1986 – Retired Major League Baseball player. Played for New York Yankees, California Angels, San Francisco Giants, Boston Red Sox.
Mark Wasikowski 1989 – Head baseball coach for the Oregon Ducks baseball team.
Justine Wong-Orantes 2013 - Olympic gold medalist and professional volleyball player.

Music

Kit Armstrong – pianist and composer
Aaron Barrett – lead singer of the ska band Reel Big Fish
Joe Escalante – bass guitarist of The Vandals and owner of Kung Fu Records; on-air personality Indie 103-FM
Scott Klopfenstein – trumpet, guitar and singer from Ska band Reel Big Fish as well as lead singer, pianist and guitar player of The Littlest Man Band
Maile Misajon – singer in the band Eden's Crush
Monique Powell and Steve White – of the ska band Save Ferris
Soopafly – Hip hop producer
Mark Trombino – Drummer of Drive Like Jehu and record producer.
Chris Tsagakis – Drummer in Rx Bandits
Brooks Wackerman – current drummer of Avenged Sevenfold, former drummer of Bad Religion, Suicidal Tendencies, and Bad 4 Good.

Notable criminals
Mikhail Markhasev - Murdered Ennis Cosby, the 27 year old son of Bill Cosby, during a robbery.
Jeremy Strohmeyer – Murdered 7 year old Sherrice Iverson at the Primadonna Resort and Casino in Primm, Nevada
Daniel Wozniak - Murdered his neighbor and friend, Samuel Eliezer "Sam" Herr and Herr's friend, Juri "Julie" Kibuishi, as part of a plan to frame Herr for Kibuishi’s murder and steal his savings.

References

External links
 Los Alamitos High School Home page
 

High schools in Orange County, California
Los Alamitos, California
Public high schools in California
Educational institutions established in 1967
1967 establishments in California